Arthur Whalley (17 February 1886 – 23 November 1952) was an English professional footballer who played as a half back in the Football League, most notably for Manchester United. He was nicknamed 'The Black Prince'.

Career 
Whalley played in the Football League for Blackpool, Manchester United, Southend United, Charlton Athletic, Millwall, Barrow and represented the Football League XI. He also played in non-league football for Brynn Central and Wigan Town. Whalley was one of eight players to be banned for life by the Football Association after a match-fixing scandal during the 1914–15 season, though in light of his war service, the ban was lifted in 1919.

Personal life 
Whalley served as a sergeant in the 2nd Football Battalion of the Middlesex Regiment during the First World War. He saw action at the battles of Flers-Courcelette, Le Transloy and Passchendaele. At Passchendaele, Whalley was seriously wounded in the head and leg and was evacuated to a hospital in Orpington, Kent. After retiring from football in 1927, Whalley worked as a bookmaker.

Career statistics

Honours 
Manchester United
Football League First Division: 1910–11

References

External links
 MUFC info profile

1886 births
1952 deaths
English footballers
Association football wing halves
Brynn Central F.C. players
Blackpool F.C. players
Manchester United F.C. players
Southend United F.C. players
Charlton Athletic F.C. players
Millwall F.C. players
Barrow A.F.C. players
English Football League players
Clapton Orient F.C. wartime guest players
English Football League representative players
British Army personnel of World War I
Middlesex Regiment soldiers
Military personnel from Merseyside
Bookmakers
Wigan Town A.F.C. players
Sportspeople involved in betting scandals